Alejandro Gallego (born 18 April 1996) is an Argentine professional footballer who plays as a midfielder.

Career
Gallego started his career with Almagro. He was first promoted into the club's senior team during the 2016–17 Primera B Nacional campaign, subsequently making his professional debut on 27 July 2017 in Almagro's season finale against Ferro Carril Oeste. He didn't make an appearance in the following campaign that was 2017–18, next appearing in September 2018 against Quilmes.

Career statistics
.

References

External links

1996 births
Living people
Place of birth missing (living people)
Argentine footballers
Association football midfielders
Primera Nacional players
Club Almagro players